Steele County Courthouse in Finley, North Dakota was built in 1925. It was listed on the National Register of Historic Places in 1985.

It was designed in very pure Classical Revival style by architects Braseth & Houkum.  It is a three-story  by  brick building.

Its construction ended contention between Finley and Hope, North Dakota claimants for the county seat.

References

Courthouses on the National Register of Historic Places in North Dakota
County courthouses in North Dakota
Neoclassical architecture in North Dakota
Government buildings completed in 1925
National Register of Historic Places in Steele County, North Dakota
1925 establishments in North Dakota